{{Infobox company
| name = Prasarana Malaysia Berhad (Prasarana)
| logo = 
| type = State-owned enterprise
| key_people = Tan Sri Jamaludin Ibrahim, 
Chairman Mohd Azharuddin Mat Sah,  President and Group CEO Dr. Prodyut Dutt, Group Chief Operating Officer (Strategy and Development) Amir Hamdan,  Chief Executive Officer, Rapid Rail  Fa’izah Khairuddin,  Chief Executive Officer, PRIDE Muhammad Yazurin Sallij Muhammad Yasin,  Chief Executive Officer, Rapid Bus  
| industry = Public transportation. Asset owner of Light Rapid Transit (LRT), monorail, bus rapid transit, stage bus, mobility van
| services = Owner and operatorCurrent:      Future:  Operator Current:  
Future:    
| revenue = 
| num_employees = 8,500+
| parent = Minister of Finance Incorporated
| website =
| slogan = 
| foundation = 1998
| location = B-20-1, Level 20, Menara UOA Bangsar, No. 5, Jalan Bangsar Utama 1, 59000 Kuala Lumpur, Malaysia
}}Prasarana Malaysia Berhad (Prasarana) (English: Malaysian Infrastructure Limited) is a 100% government-owned company which was set up by Ministry of Finance (Malaysia) as a corporate body established under the Minister of Finance (Incorporation)  Act 1957 to own the assets of multi-modal public transport operator in Malaysia, under the government's move to restructure the city's public transport system. It is one of the largest public-transport companies in Malaysia other than Konsortium Transnasional Berhad. As a government-owned company since 1998, it operates stage bus and light metro services via several wholly owned subsidiaries.

Subsidiaries

The new Prasarana structure including the creation of four new entities – Rapid Rail Sdn Bhd; Rapid Bus Sdn Bhd; Prasarana Integrated Management and Engineering Services Sdn Bhd (PRIME); and Prasarana Integrated Development Sdn Bhd, or PRIDE. Announcing this at a media briefing in Kuala Lumpur on 3 January 2013, ex-Prasarana Group Managing Director Dato’ Shahril Mokhtar said the move was part of the company's five-year long-term plan as underlined under its Go Forward Plan 2.0 (GFP 2.0) blueprint.

Service brand
 Rapid KL trains operated by Rapid Rail Sdn Bhd
 Rapid KL buses operated by Rapid Bus Sdn Bhd
 Rapid Penang buses operated by Rapid Bus Sdn Bhd
 Rapid Kuantan buses operated by Rapid Bus Sdn Bhd
 My Rapid Touch 'n Go Card is the stored value card for fare usage at Rapid KL trains and buses only.
 Mutiara Pass is a pass that offers commuters unlimited rides on Rapid Penang buses services for 30 consecutive days.

Operations
Prasarana's primary business is providing public-transport services in Malaysia. Its main operations are the following:
 Rapid Bus Sdn Bhd – Rapid KL buses operate in Klang Valley and Selangor, providing services for more than 200 routes including routes to support the operations of its sister company Rapid Rail Sdn Bhd. As reflected by their names, Rapid Penang operates in the island of Penang and Butterworth; covering 46 routes. Rapid Kuantan, which commenced operations on 1 December 2012, currently services a total of 12 routes around the state capital of Pahang.
 Rapid Rail Sdn Bhd – operates the operational 114 stations along the LRT Ampang and Sri Petaling Lines, LRT Kelana Jaya Line, KL Monorail, MRT Kajang Line and Putrajaya Line network in Kuala Lumpur under brand name of Rapid KL.
 Prasarana Integrated Development Sdn Bhd – being in the transport infrastructural development sector to tap and maximise on the economic potential of its government-assigned land banks and real estate of Prasarana owned several properties in the form of train stations, depot and Park-n-Ride facilities for commuters.
 Prasarana Integrated Management & Engineering Services Sdn Bhd – developing and managing Rapid Rail Sdn Bhd infrastructure and facilities; rolling stocks; wayside systems; applied systems; bus infrastructure and systems; works contract; project governance; business development; and project safety and health management.

 International Presence 
 Awarded as shadow operator (operation & maintenance) of Al Mashaaer Al Mugaddassah Metro Southern Line since November 2014 to 2017.

 Station naming rights program 

In an effort to increase revenue beyond advertising and fare collection, Prasarana Malaysia Berhad has introduced a new "station naming rights program", in which brands and companies will bid for a chance to rename and rebrand any selected stations owned by Prasarana for a fee. This program runs in tandem with the infrastructure plan to promote the use of public transport and to improve facilities and services through the rebranding and upgrading of the stations.

GGICO (Dubai Metro) is example of the first project in the world to start the similar program. This step has been followed by Vodafone–Sol (Madrid Metro) and Atlantic Avenue–Barclays Center (New York City Subway).

The prefix name of the station will be given to the successful bidder and the bidder has a right on the elements around the stations such as station area, route maps, pamphlets and brochures, operator website and also the train destination announcement. According to the source of Prasarana Malaysia, the original name of the station is fixed to indicate the location of the station.

First of its kind in Southeast Asia, the first three pilot projects on LRT and monorail stations have been accomplished, namely the AirAsia-Bukit Bintang Monorail station, Bank Rakyat-Bangsar LRT station and KL Gateway-Universiti LRT station has been launched on 10 October 2015. KL Gateway is the major redevelopment of Kampung Kerinchi into premium residential, shopping mall & office tower by Suez Capital, a local property development.Why Are LRT Stations Being Rebranded And Renamed Like 'Bank Rakyat-Bangsar'?

On 1 May 2017, the CGC-Glenmarie LRT station became the fourth station renamed under the Station Naming Rights programme.

On 11 July 2017 (a week before the launching of the MRT Sungai Buloh-Kajang Line Phase 2 operations), another four stations joined under the programme, namely Pavilion Damansara Heights-Pusat Bandar Damansara, Manulife-Semantan, Pavilion Kuala Lumpur-Bukit Bintang and AEON-Maluri.

Extension projects

Kuala Lumpur Light Rail Transit Line 3 (LRT3) project
The LRT3 project currently under construction is Shah Alam Line which will cover the western area of Klang Valley.

Kuala Lumpur Additional Vehicle (KLAV) project
The KLAV project will minimize Kelana Jaya Line headway frequency not more than 2.8 minutes when fully deploy a new additional order of 14 Bombardier Innovia Metro ART 300 in configuration of 4-car trainsets January 2016.

Monorail fleet expansion project
Prasarana has awarded the contract to Scomi Transit Projects Sdn Bhd, a subsidiary of Scomi Engineering Bhd. Valued at approximately RM494 million, the contract also included upgrading works on the monorail stations and the electrical and mechanical system and building a new monorail depot apart from the supply of the 12 sets of new 4-car trainsets. Currently, only 6 trainsets has been delivered to Rapid Rail, therefore the operator is unable to activate the automatic platform gates & to phase-out the old 2-car trainsets.

Rapid bus fleet expansion project
Prasarana is still in the proposal phase to extend their stage bus service to all Malaysian city states to improve public transport across the country. As previously with the use of services by the city state under the name of the Prasarana's subsidiary of Rapid Bus are likely to be used is Rapid SP in Sungai Petani, Kedah and Rapid Manjung in Perak.

BRT Sunway Line project
The one and only first of its kind Bus rapid transit (BRT) project in Malaysia is BRT Sunway Line. Launched by Prime Minister Datuk Seri Mohd Najib Tun Razak on 9 June 2012, the BRT Sunway Line is a public-private partnership project between Prasarana and Sunway Group to provide eco-friendly electric bus services on elevated tracks for residents in Bandar Sunway and Subang Jaya.

Klang Valley Mass Rapid Transit project
The Government has set up a dedicated unit focused solely on Klang Valley Mass Rapid Transit project namely Mass Rapid Transit Corporation Sdn Bhd (MRT Corp). The MRT Corp is a project management and technical team comprising experts in mass rail projects and include expertise seconded from the Prasarana MRT team.

History

Restructuring Klang Valley's public transport system
The need for the Klang Valley's public transport system to be restructured became apparent almost immediately after the LRT lines  began commercial operations when their ridership was much lower than anticipated. This caused lower than expected revenue levels and the two LRT concessionaires, Sistem Transit Aliran Ringan Sdn Bhd (Star-LRT) and Projek Usahasama Transit Ringan Automatik Sdn Bhd (Putra-LRT), could not repay their commercial loans. The financial crisis of 1997/1998 aggravated the situation. The two companies owed a total of RM5.7bil as at November 2001 when the government's Corporate Debt Restructuring Committee (CDRC) restructured the debts of the two LRT companies.

The bus service in Kuala Lumpur was also facing problems with lower ridership because of an increase in private car usage and the lack of capital investments. The two new bus consortia which were formed in the mid-1990s to take over all bus services in Kuala Lumpur – Intrakota and Cityliner – began facing financial problems. Intrakota had reportedly accumulated losses amounting to RM450 million from the 1997/1998 financial crisis until Prasarana took over in 2003, and debts of more than RM250 million between 1994 and 2003. With lower revenues, bus operators could not maintain their fleets, much less invest in more buses. Frequencies and service deteriorated as buses began breaking down.

Because of this, public transport usage in the Klang Valley area dropped to about 16% of total trips, one of the lowest in the Asian region.

Setting up of Syarikat Prasarana Negara Berhad and Rangkaian Pengangkutan Intergrasi Deras Sdn Bhd
As part of the restructuring process, the Malaysian government proposed to separate the ownership (thus capital expenditure) and operational aspects of public transport, with separate government-owned companies being set up for each purpose.

In 1998, Prasarana was incorporated to "facilitate, coordinate, undertake and expedite infrastructure projects approved by the Malaysian government". It took over the assets and operations of Star-LRT, Putra-LRT and Putraline feeder bus services in September 2002, changing the name Star-LRT to "Starline" and Putra-LRT to "Putraline". In 2003, Prasarana entered into agreements with Intrakota and Cityliner for the purchase of buses. The purchase was completed in 2004.

Rangkaian Pengangkutan Intergrasi Deras Sdn Bhd, the second government-owned company under the restructuring, was set up in 2004 to handle the operational aspects of the assets owned by Prasarana. Prasarana handed over the operations of the two LRT lines and buses in November 2004.

In 2006, the government set up a new company Rapid Penang as a subsidiary of Rangkaian Pengangkutan Intergrasi Deras Sdn Bhd to operate a bus service in Penang. The buses are also owned by Prasarana.

Taking over of assets

Projek Usahasama Transit Ringan Automatik Sdn Bhd (Putra-LRT)
Putra-LRT was incorporated in Malaysia on 15 February 1994 to design, construct, finance, operate and maintain the Klang Valley's LRT system, known today as the Kelana Jaya Line. The company, which was 100% owned by Renong Berhad, signed the concession agreement with the Malaysian government on 7 August 1995. To fund the project, Putra-LRT obtained a RM2 billion loan, comprising RM1 billion conventional facility and RM1 billion Islamic facility, from 27 Malaysian financial and non-financial institutions which was arranged by four major Malaysian financial institutions, namely Commerce International Merchant Bankers Bhd (CIMB), Bank Bumiputra Malaysia Bhd (BBMB), Commerce MGI Sdn Bhd (CMGI) and Bank Islam. The 27 institutions included the KWSP (EPF), Affin Bank and Public Bank.

The takeover of Putra-LRT can be said to have started from 30 September 1999 when the payment of interest amounting to RM44,589,020.33 became due. Failure to pay resulted in the entire loan amount becoming due. At that time, Putra-LRT had already requested the Corporate Debt Restructuring Committee of Malaysia's central bank, Bank Negara, to help restructure its debts. A proposal by the Corporate Debt Restructuring Committee, which involved the government taking over the two LRT lines and then leasing them back to the two companies, was deemed not acceptable.

The restructuring began moving again when the government accepted the concept of setting up two separate government-owned companies, one to own and the other to operate public transport. The first step towards nationalisation of Putra-LRT took place on 26 November 2001 when Prasarana acquired all the rights, benefits and entitlements under the loan from Putra-LRT's and also Star-LRT's lenders (see below for takeover of Star-LRT). This effectively made Prasarana the creditor of Putra-LRT and Star-LRT. The loans owed by both companies stood at approximately RM5.7 billion at that time. The purchase consideration was satisfied via the issuance of RM5.468 billion fixed rate serial bonds by Prasarana guaranteed by the government to the respective Star-LRT and Putra-LRT lenders. According to the Corporate Debt Restructuring Committee, the successful resolution of the debt restructuring of the two companies was estimated to have reduced the level of non-performing loans in the Malaysian banking system by RM2.9 billion or 0.7% on a net six-month basis. Commerce International Merchant Bankers Bhd was appointed as was appointed as facility agent.

On 8 December 2001, Prasarana issued Putra-LRT with a notice of default and demanded payment of all outstanding amounts within 14 days. Putra-LRT replied on 24 December 2001 and informed Prasarana that it was not able to settle the amounts. It also requested the government to appoint another party or itself to purchase the assets of the company in accordance with the terms of the concession agreement between Putra-LRT and the government. A statutory demand, required under the Malaysian Companies Act 1965, was then issued by Prasarana on 26 December 2001 asking Putra-LRT to settle the amount owing within 21 days. Putra-LRT again replied on 17 January 2002 by saying that it was unable to settle the amounts owed and requested the government to take over. Winding up petitions were filed on 8 February 2002 and served on the company on 20 March 2002. On 26 April 2002, the Kuala Lumpur High Court made an order for the winding up of Putra-LRT and on the same date, appointed the Gan Ah Tee, Ooi Woon Chee and Mohamed Raslan Bin Abdul Rahman as liquidators. Earlier on 3 April 2002, the Malaysia Ministry of Finance had officially announced that the government via Prasarana was taking over the assets of both Putra-LRT and Star-LRT.

On 30 August 2002, Putra-LRT entered into a sale and purchase agreement with Prasarana for the sale of all its assets. The consideration for the sale consisted of the balance after the project cost of RM5,246,070,539 is offset by the amount of debt owed to Prasarana, plus the project cost from 1 April 2002 until 1 September 2002 which was set as the completion date of the sale, plus a sum of RM16,867,910 being the "unverified amount of project costs" which was subsequently verified by supporting documents. The entire cost of Prasarana taking over Putra-LRT's assets was reported to be RM4.5 billion.

Prasarana took over Putra-LRT assets and operations from 6.00 a.m. on 1 September 2002.

Sistem Transit Aliran Ringan Sdn Bhd (STAR-LRT)

Details of the takeover of Sistem Transit Aliran Ringan Sendirian Berhad (abbreviated to Star-LRT), which operated what is known today as the Ampang Line, are a little more difficult to come when compared with the takeover of PUTRA-LRT because the company was not owned by any public listed company.
The shareholders of Star-LRT, which was formed on 13 November 1991, were the Malaysian Employees Provident Fund (25%), Kuala Lumpur Transit Group Assets Sdn Bhd (a 50:50 joint venture between Germany's AEG Pte Ltd, the electronics division of Daimler-Benz, and British construction firm Taylor-Woodrow) (30%), Lembaga Urusan Tabung Haji (Pilgrims’ Fund Board) (15%), Lembaga Tabung Angkatan Tentera (5%), Kumpulan Wang Amanah Pencen (5%), STLR Sdn Bhd (5%) and Shell Malaysia/Sabah/Sarawak (5%), American International Assurance Co Ltd (10%), Apfin Investments Pte Ltd, the investment arm of the Singapore Government (5%).
The 60-year concession agreement between Star-LRT and the Malaysian government for Phase One of the project (between Sultan Ismail and Ampang stations) was signed on 22 December 1992 while the separate concession agreement for Phase Two (between Chan Sow Lin and Sri Petaling stations, and Sultan Ismail and Sentul Timur stations) was signed on 26 June 1995.
The cost of Phase One was RM1.2 billion and RM2.2 billion for Phase Two. Star-LRT raised loans amounting to RM800 million for Phase One and RM1.32 billion from Bank Bumiputra Malaysia Bhd for Phase Two.

In the late 1990s, Star-LRT, like Putra-LRT, also defaulted in its loan repayment and on 30 November 2001, the Corporate Debt Restructuring Committee of Malaysia's central bank Bank Negara announced that Prasarana had taken over the debts of Star-LRT together with that of Putra-LRT. The combined debt of both companies amounted to RM5.5 billion.

On 8 December 2001, Prasarana issued a letter of demand for a sum of RM1,045,681,273.83 owing as at that date pursuant to a facility agreement entered on 13 August 1993. There was however no reply. On 10 December 2001, another letter of demand was issued to Star-LRT for a sum of RMI,498,538,278.58 pursuant to a loan agreement dated 17 July 1995 for the financing of Phase Two of the project. On 26 Dec, it served statutory notice of demand on STAR-LRT, again asking for the return of the sum and the company only managed to make part payment.

Two petitions to wind up Star-LRT were filed with the High Court on 21 February 2002 for the failure to pay RM1,051,509,127.16 as at 26 December 2001 for the first loan and the failure to repay the second loan amounting to RM1,506,385,705.28 as at 26 December. On 3 May 2002, the High Court appointed Gan Ah Tee, Ooi Woon Chee and Mohamed Raslan Abdul Rahman as temporary liquidators.

On 1 September 2002, Prasarana took over the assets and operations of Star-LRT. The takeover reportedly cost the government RM3.3 billion.

Intrakota Komposit Sendirian Berhad

Intrakota Komposit Sendirian Berhad, a subsidiary of public-listed company DRB-Hicom Berhad, was one of two consortia picked in 1994 to run the city/stage bus service in Kuala Lumpur and its surrounding suburbs. The other company was Park May Berhad which operated its buses under the brandname Cityliner. Under the policy, Intrakota bought and took over the routes of two traditional Kuala Lumpur bus companies, namely SJ Kenderaan Sendirian Berhad (better known as Sri Jaya) and Toong Fong Omnibus Company Sendirian Berhad, one of Kuala Lumpur's first bus companies. Intrakota also took over most of Kuala Lumpur's minibus routes after the government terminated their services in 1998. All buses were branded as Intrakota.

The circumstances leading to Intrakota's financial difficulties could be blamed on the financial crisis of 1997/1998, the decreasing number of people using public transport and the failure by the government to implement the two-bus-consortia policy which resulted in unexpected competition.

In 1999, the Intrakota group of companies came under the purview of the government's Corporate Debt Reestructuring Committee and when the committee concluded its business in June 2002, Intrakota and its parent company DRB-Hicom continued negotiating with the government which eventually led to its buses being taken over by Prasarana.

The company's dire situation was clear when on 29 January 2003, creditors RHB Finance Berhad and RHB Delta Finance Berhad repossessed 34 of its buses. The buses were returned to Intrakota after several rounds of negotiations with the creditors. On the same day, it also revealed that it was being sued or a total of RM25,893,558.36 by AMMerchant Bank Berhad (RM11,234,839.93), Kewangan Bersatu Berhad (RM1,091,939.12) and Sogelease Advance (Malaysia) Sendirian Berhad (RM13,566,786.31). Later, when restructuring the debt of Intrakota, DRB-Hicom declared that the company had an accumulated debt of RM258 million as at 30 June 2003, comprising a principal sum of RM188.2 million and interest amounting to RM69.8 million.

On 29 October 2003, Intrakota, together with its subsidiaries Intrakota Consolidated Berhad, SJ Kenderaan Sendirian Berhad, Toong Fong Omnibus Company Sendirian Berhad, Syarikat Pengangkutan Malaysia Sendirian Berhad and SJ Binteknik Sendirian Berhad, as well as another DRB-Hicom subsidiary Euro Truck and Bus (Malaysia) sendirian Berhad, entered into a sale and purchase agreement with Prasarana for the sale of their bus related assets for a total of RM176,975,604. The original acquisition costs of the assets were approximately RM557.4 million, which were acquired over a period of 9 years since 1994. The net book value of the assets as at 30 June 2003 was approximately RM269.9 million.

The sale of assets to Prasarana was completed on 5 May 2004. On the same day, Prasarana signed an interim operations and maintenance agreement with Intrakota Consolidated for the temporary operation of the bus network previously operated by Intrakota. The interim arrangement was terminated when Prasarana handed over the operations to RapidKL in November 2004.

In May 2008, the Malay Mail ran an article investigating the fate of the remaining Intrakota buses. 1,000 Iveco TurboCities that were originally purchased at a cost of RM0.5 million each were found abandoned in Batang Kali and Rawang, each only guarded by a single security personnel. Criticism was directed at RapidKL on what is seen as a 'wasteful exercise', the old buses being only 7 to 15 years old and more expensive than the newly purchased Mercedes-Benz buses by RapidKL.

Cityliner Sendirian Berhad
The Cityliner buses involved in the takeover by Prasarana were those operated by two companies – Cityliner Sendirian Berhad and Len Chee Omnibus Company Sendirian Berhad – in Kuala Lumpur under the brand name “Cityliner”. The two companies were subsidiaries of previously public-listed Park May Berhad, which in turn was a subsidiary of Renong Berhad. Cityliner, which was incorporated on 30 August 1994, was wholly owned by Park May while Park May owned 85% of Len Chee.

In 1995, Cityliner took over routes previously operated by Len Omnibus Company Berhad, Selangor Omnibus Company Berhad and Foh Hup Transportation Company Berhad which were within a 15 km radius of the city centre of Kuala Lumpur under the government's policy of having two bus consortia to operate city buses in the Klang Valley. Len Chee was incorporated on 29 December 1937 and was one of the pioneer bus companies in Kuala Lumpur. It was bought over by Park May in 1995 under the same government policy.

Cityliner was also the brand name for bus services in parts of Seberang Perai, Penang; parts of Negeri Sembilan state; Kuantan, Pahang; and between Klang and Sabak Bernam in Selangor. These services, known as the “northern”, “southern”, “eastern" and "central groups” respectively, were not involved in the takeover by Prasarana.

Operating city or stage buses has always been Park May's main business. However, the group, which also operates long-distance express bus services began making losses following tough operation circumstances, with city/stage bus operations contributing a huge proportion of these losses. Besides a reduction in the number of public transport users, the company also blamed the government's failure to implement its earlier policy of only having two bus consortia, one of which was Park May, to operate city buses in Kuala Lumpur for its financial difficulties. This began affecting its bus operations as lack of maintenance caused frequent breakdowns, resulting in unreliable service.

Park May, on 1 March 1999, applied to the Corporate Debt Restructuring Committee to seek the assistance to restructure its debts.

On 27 October 2003, Cityliner and Len Chee signed an asset sale and purchase agreement with Prasarana for the sale of 321 buses and 43 buses owned by Cityliner and Len Chee respectively for a total cash consideration of RM14,841,012. Of this amount, RM13,456,649 was to be used as part redemption of the commercial paper/medium term notes programme which was obtained on 23 January 2007, and RM1,220,000 was to go towards defraying the expenses of the sale to Prasarana. The sale was completed on 30 April 2004 for a total adjusted cash consideration of RM14,438,920 for 347 buses.

Upon completion of the sale, Prasarana appointed Kenderaan Mekar Murni Sdn Bhd, a subdiary of Kumpulan Kenderaan Malaysia Berhad, to operate the buses on an interim basis until it handed over operations to RapidKL in November. Under Park May's restructuring scheme, Kumpulan Kenderaan Malaysia ultimately instituted a reverse-takeover of Park May and assumed Park May's listed status under the new name Konsortium Transnasional Berhad.

Important dates
 11 August 1998: Prasarana incorporated to facilitate, co-ordinate, undertake and expedite infrastructure projects approved by the Malaysian government.
 1 September 2002: Prasarana begins operations when it took over the ownership and operations of Star-LRT, Putra-LRT and the Putraline feeder bus services. It renamed Star-LRT Starline while Putra-LRT became known as Putraline.
 6 January 2003: Prasarana takes over ownership and operations of the Langkawi Cable Car from Langkawi Cable Car Sdn Bhd. It forms Panorama Langkawi Sdn Bhd to operate the system.
 27 October 2003: Prasarana buys Cityliner buses and routes from Park May Bhd. It then appoints Kenderaan Mekar Murni Sdn Bhd to operate the bus routes on an interim basis.
 29 October 2003: Prasarana buys Intrakota buses from DRB-Hicom Bhd but allows Intrakota operating as interim operator.
 November 2004: Prasarana hands over operations of the LRT and bus network to Rapid KL.
 13 October 2006: Prasarana signs an agreement with a Bombardier-Hartasuma joint venture for the purchase of 22 four-car train sets for the Kelana Jaya Line with an option to purchase an additional 13 train sets for RM1.2 billion. First 22 train sets to be delivered in 2008.
 19 February 2007: Malaysian Prime Minister Abdullah Ahmad Badawi announced that the bus network in Penang will undergo a revamp similar to that which occurred in Kuala Lumpur. A day later, Malaysian Finance Minister parliamentary secretary Hilmi Yahaya said the new entity will be named Rapid Penang.
 25 February 2007: Malaysian Second Finance Minister Nor Mohamed Yakcop said 150, at a cost of RM50mil, will make their first appearance on Penang roads in August 2007. He said Rapid Penang will be a subsidiary of Rapid KL.
 31 July 2007: RapidPenang begins operations, offering commuters free rides, after being launched by Prime Minister Abdullah Ahmad Badawi. The company started charging passengers three days later on 3 August 2007.
 8 October 2007: Prasarana purchase additional 52 train sets from Bombardier, using options from 2006 purchase. Delivery expected in 2010.
 27 November 2007: Prasarana signed a sales and purchase agreement with KL Monorail System Sdn Bhd to be the operator of KL Monorail. Prasarana will assume all KLMS Sdn Bhd loan to Bank Pembangunan of RM882 million
 1 July 2009: RapidKL become a wholly owned subsidiary of Prasarana.
 1 September 2009: RapidPenang become a wholly owned subsidiary of Prasarana.

Gallery

See also
 Malayan Railways
 Prasarana Malaysia''' Berhad
 Rapid Bus Sdn Bhd
 Rapid KL
 BRT Sunway Line
 Rapid Penang
 Rapid Kuantan
 Rapid Rail Sdn Bhd
 Rapid KL
 Ampang Line & Sri Petaling Line (LRT1)
 Kelana Jaya Line (LRT2)
 KL Monorail
 Bandar Utama-Klang Line (LRT3)
 MRT Corp
 Klang Valley Mass Rapid Transit Project
 Kajang Line (MRT1)
 Putrajaya line (MRT2)
 Circle Line (MRT3)
 MyHSR Corp
  Kuala Lumpur–Singapore High Speed Rail Project
 Land Public Transport Commission (SPAD)
 Public transport in Kuala Lumpur
 Rail transport in Malaysia

References

External links
 Official myRapid website

1998 establishments in Malaysia
Government-owned companies of Malaysia
Malaysian companies established in 1998
Minister of Finance (Incorporated) (Malaysia)
Privately held companies of Malaysia